Callon may refer to:

Callon, Wisconsin, an unincorporated community
The Callon estate, a part of Preston, Lancashire, a city in Lancashire, England
Michel Callon, a French sociologist
Callon of Epidaurus, an intersex person